The Shell Building is an office building in downtown St. Louis, Missouri. Located at the corner of Locust Street and 13th Street, known as Shell Corner, the 13-story, building was the original home of the Shell Oil Company in the United States. The building has a rounded footprint, following the curve of Locust onto North 13th Street. It is currently a Hilton Home2/Tru hotel.

The building was listed on the National Register of Historic Places in 2015.

References

External links
 Shell Building Website

Office buildings completed in 1926
Shell plc buildings and structures
Buildings and structures in St. Louis
Commercial buildings in Missouri
National Register of Historic Places in St. Louis
Downtown St. Louis
1926 establishments in Missouri
Skyscrapers in St. Louis